Straits Quay Retail Marina is a shopping mall-cum-marina in George Town, Penang, Malaysia. It is located at Seri Tanjung Pinang, a newly developed township that sits on reclaimed land within the George Town suburb of Tanjung Tokong. Opened in 2010, the seaside mall also consists of a marina designed for small recreational vessels, as well as a convention centre.

Royal Selangor, a Malaysian pewter manufacturer, maintains an outlet within the mall.  There is also a Performing Arts Centre within the mall. In addition, Straits Quay includes luxurious serviced apartments called The Suites @ Straits Quay, which are managed by the Eastern & Oriental Hotel, a colonial seaside hotel located within the heart of George Town.

Retail outlets 

Straits Quay has a net space of 270,000 sq ft and two floors which house a total of 100 shop lots. Various retail choices and eateries are available here, including Starbucks, Fruuze, Subway, Switch and Royal Selangor.

A Sam's Groceria supermarket is also available at the ground floor.

In general, the retail choices in the mall cater more to lifestyle, personal care and home furnishing. Shoppers and visitors can get to have a meal at one of the seaside cafes, restaurants and bars that offer an impressive view of the expanse of the Malacca Straits.

Every weekend, a bargain market is held within Straits Quay, where cheaper brands and items can be purchased from about 50 stalls.

Facilities 

The Straits Quay Marina consists of 40 pontoon berths that can accommodate yachts and other recreational boats between 10 and 25 metres in length. The entrance of the marina has been dredged to a depth of 3 metres below sea level.

The marina also contains the Straits Quay Convention Centre (SQCC), making it one of the venues of choice within Penang for meetings, incentives, conferences and exhibitions (MICE). Spanning , SQCC has a capacity of up to 150 standard exhibition booths, 2,300 delegates in a theatre setting or 1,800 guests in a banquet setting.

Sailors and tourists can stay at The Suites @ Straits Quay, the 217 luxurious serviced apartment suites just above the shopping mall.

The Performing Arts Centre of Penang (Penangpac) is housed at the 4th floor of Straits Quay, also above the shopping mall. It is equipped with a 303-seater proscenium stage, a 160-seater black box theatre, studios and gallery spaces. The arts centre, which was launched in 2011, was envisioned as the main venue within northern Malaysia for the arts, from films to street art performances.

Location 
Straits Quay is situated at Jalan Seri Tanjung Pinang, Tanjung Tokong, George Town.

Transportation 
Rapid Penang's Hop-On Hop-Off double decker bus service, which caters for tourists, stops at Straits Quay. In addition, a free shuttle service is offered by the mall for hotel guests coming from Batu Ferringhi.

A water limousine service is available between Straits Quay and the Eastern & Oriental Hotel, which is located within George Town's UNESCO World Heritage Site to the east. Said to be Penang's first water taxi service, the vessel, Lady Martina, also brings patrons for a ride along the northern coastline of Penang Island every Saturday evening.

See also 
 List of shopping malls in Malaysia

External links 
 Straits Quay

References 

Shopping malls in Penang
Shopping malls established in 2010
Buildings and structures in George Town, Penang
2010 establishments in Malaysia